Hydrophorus philombrius  is a species of brachyceran flies in the family of Dolichopodidae. The scientific name of the species was first published in 1890 by William Morton Wheeler.

References 

Insects described in 1890
philombrius
Diptera of North America
Taxa named by William Morton Wheeler